Marcel Bluwal (25 May 1925 – 23 October 2021) was a French film director and screenwriter who  directed more than 40 films in his career.

Selected filmography

Director
 Carom Shots (1963)
 The New Adventures of Vidocq (1971, TV series)
 Clérambard (1990)
 À droite toute (2008)

Actor
 Sortie de secours (1970)
 Frantic (1988) - Man in Tweed
 L'argent fait le bonheur (1993) - M. Viali
 Le voyage en Arménie (2006) - Barsam (final film role)

References

External links

1925 births
2021 deaths
French film directors
French male screenwriters
French screenwriters
Writers from Paris